Route 37 may refer to:

Route 37 (WMATA), a bus route in Washington, D.C.
London Buses route 37

See also
List of highways numbered 37

37